The National Liberal Party–Tătărescu (PNL-Tătărescu) was a liberal and social liberal political party in the Kingdom of Romania and then in the Socialist Republic of Romania. It was established as a breakaway faction (or spin off) from the main, historical National Liberal Party (PNL) in 1944. From December 1947 onwards, the party was generally referred to as the National Liberal Party–Bejan (PNL-Bejan), as initial leader (or party president) Gheorghe Tătărescu resigned from the party and was replaced by the party's second and last leader, Petre Bejan, before being banned or dissolved by the Communist authorities in 1950.

History 

The party resulted from a split in the National Liberal Party (PNL), with the faction centered around Gheorghe Tătărescu, former twice Prime Minister of Romania (both as PNL member and as FRN member), the party's general secretary, establishing a distinct party organisation in late 1944 (the other breakway faction of the PNL, which supported its own party president in the person Gheorghe I. Brătianu, was consequently known as PNL-Brătianu, but ceased to exist in 1938). 

In April 1946, the party opted to join the pro-governmental Bloc of Democratic Parties (BPD). At the November 1946 elections, the Bloc won 347 of the 414 seats, with the PNL-T taking 75. In the 1948 elections, the party ran separately as PNL-Bejan, in opposition to the Communist governmental coalition led by Petru Groza and only receiving 7 seats in the Great National Assembly, the unicameral Romanian Parliament back then and the equivalent of the nowadays Chamber of Deputies. The party was subsequently banned (or dissolved) by the Romanian Communist authorities in 1950.

In stark contrast to the breakaway faction led by Tătărescu and then by Bejan, the main, historical PNL which was led by its last president, Dinu Brătianu, until it was banned (or dissolved) by the Romanian Communist authorities as well (early on in 1948), remained staunchly anti-governmental and in continuous opposition towards the Communists led by Groza.

Leadership

Electoral history

Legislative elections

See also
Liberalism and radicalism in Romania

Notes

References

Defunct political parties in Romania
Liberal parties in Romania
National Liberal Party (Romania)